A list of roads in Tajikistan.

Systems 
The highways in Tajikistan are divided into two groups, based on the level of their significance whose names differ by a code letter.
 РБ – highways of international significance (Rohi Baynalmilaly); РБ01 to РБ19
 РҶ – highways of republic significance (Rohi Jumhuriyavy); РҶ001 to РҶ095

International Highways

Republic Highways

Asian Highways
Several of the highway of the Asian Highway Network cross Tajikistan. These include the following:

 
 РБ15 Road: Khavast - Zarafshon - Istaravshan 
 РБ01 Road : Istaravshan - Dushanbe 
 РБ09 Road : Dushanbe - Qizilqala - Bokhtar - Panji Poyon
 
 РБ07 Road : Karamyk - Vahdat
 РБ04 Road : Vahdat  - Dushanbe - Tursunzada
 РБ02 Road : Dushanbe - Tursunzada

  Kulma Pass -  Murghab - Khorugh - Kalaikhumb - Vahdat - Dushanbe

E-Roads
Several of the highway of the International E-road network cross Tajikistan. These include the following:

 РБ02 Road: Tursunzoda - Dushanbe (E123)
 РБ04 Road: Dushanbe - Vahdat
 РБ07 Road: Vahdat - Obi Garm - Vahdat (Jirgatol)

 РБ15 Road: Border of Uzbekistan - Zarafshon - Istaravshan
 РБ01 Road: Istaravshan - Spitamen - Ayni - Dushanbe
 РБ09 Road: Dushanbe - Qizilqala - Bokhtar - Panji Poyon

 РБ01 Road: Ayni (E 123) - Dehmoy - Khujand
 РБ14 Road: Dehmoy - Ghafurov - Konibodom - Border of Uzbekistan

 РБ04 Road: Dushanbe - Vahdat - Kulob - Khorugh - Murghob - Kulma - Border of China

 РБ07 Road: Vahdat (Jirgatol) -  Gharm (Rasht) - Labi Jar
 РБ03 Road: Labi Jar - Qal'ai Khumb
 РБ04 Road: Qal'ai Khumb - Khorugh
 РБ06 Road: Khorugh - Ishkoshim - Langar - Border of Afghanistan

References
 Full list in English and Tajiki (2021), World Bank, https://documents1.worldbank.org/curated/en/545481624287902413/pdf/Assessment-of-Economic-Impacts-from-Disasters-Along-Key-Corridors.pdf (Archive)

See also
 Full list in Russian (2009), UNECE, https://unece.org/fileadmin/DAM/hlm/prgm/cph/experts/tajikistan/Documents/draft.stateprogram.transport.devt.2010.2025.ru.pdf (Archive)
 2011 law, and list of "International roads" http://bamap.org/information/news/2011/08/01/15115/print/

See also
 Roads in Armenia
 Roads in Azerbaijan
 Roads in Georgia (country)
 Roads in Kazakhstan
 Roads in Kyrgyzstan